Kot Kamboh is a small town located in the Sargodha District of the Punjab province, Pakistan. .

References

Populated places in Sargodha District